Table Tennis Australia is the National Sporting Organisation for the Sport of Table Tennis in Australia and is affiliated with both the ITTF (International Table Tennis Federation) which oversees the international governance and development of Table Tennis and the OTTF (Oceania Table Tennis Federation) which oversees the sport development at a regional level.

History
In 1923, the South Australian Table Tennis Association and the Queensland Association were formed. The Victorian Table Tennis Association began its operations in 1925 and New South Wales in 1930. Following interstate visits by these four associations, the Australian Board of Control was formed in 1933. In 1936, affiliation with the International Table Tennis Federation was made. In 1937, the Board of Control was reconstructed into the Australian Table Tennis Association. Table tennis on an organised basis came to a standstill because of World War II; however the game was played extensively in defence camps and for charitable purposes. To revive the game after the war, a special meeting was held in 1947, and the Constitution was revised and General Regulations were adopted. In 1994, the body took its current name of Table Tennis Australia Inc.

State bodies
 Table Tennis New South Wales
 Table Tennis Victoria
 Table Tennis Queensland
 Table Tennis South Australia
 Western Australia Table Tennis Association
 Table Tennis Tasmania
 Table Tennis Northern Territory
 Table Tennis ACT

National Championships
Each year there are a number of National Championships run by TTA for each Age Grouping

See also

References

External links
 

Australia
Table tennis in Australia
Sports governing bodies in Australia